Marquess of Villamejor is a hereditary title in the peerage of Spain, granted in 1718 by Charles VI, Holy Roman Emperor to José Antonio de Torres Mesía, once he had renounced to the throne of Spain following the War of Spanish Succession. The title was confirmed in the peerage of Spain in 1726 by Philip V.

Marquesses of Villamejor (1718)

José Antonio de Torres Mesía y Morales, 1st Marquess of Villamejor
Manuel María de Torres y Dávalos, 2nd Marquess of Villamejor
José Tomás de Torres y Velasco, 3rd Marquess of Villamejor
José María de Torres y Bastida, 4th Marquess of Villamejor
José Silvestre de Torres y Tovar, 5th Marquess of Villamejor
Ana Josefa de Torres y Romo, 6th Marchioness of Villamejor
Gonzalo de Figueroa y Torres, 7th Marquess of Villamejor
Gonzalo de Figueroa y O'Neill, 8th Marquess of Villamejor
Jaime de Figueroa y O'Neill, 9th Marquess of Villamejor
Jaime de Figueroa y Castro, 10th Marquess of Villamejor
Mónica de Figueroa y Cernuda, 11th Marchioness of Villamejor

See also
Marquess of Villabrágima
Marquess of San Damián
Count of Yebes
Count of Velayos

References

Marquesses of Spain
Lists of Spanish nobility
Noble titles created in 1718